Henry Levin (5 June 1909 – 1 May 1980) began as a stage actor and director but was most notable as an American film director of over fifty feature films. His best known credits were Jolson Sings Again (1949), Journey to the Center of the Earth (1959) and Where the Boys Are (1960).

Biography

Acting
Levin began as an actor. He was on Broadway in Somewhere in France (1941) and appeared in summer stock in Cuckoos on the Hearth (1941). He worked for Brock Pemberton stage productions.

Columbia Pictures

Dialogue Director
In May 1943 Levin signed a contract to work at Columbia Pictures. He was one of three stage director recruited by the studio – the others were William Castle and Leslie Urbach. Levin's job was to work with the younger Columbia actors.

In April Levin was hired to work as dialogue director on The Clock Struck Twelve (later titled Passport to Suez) with Warren William, one of the Lone Wolf films. He later went on to be dialogue director on Dangerous Blondes (1943), Appointment in Berlin (1943) and Two Man Submarine (1944).

Levin then was contracted to Columbia Pictures as a director along with several other "potentials" who began as dialogue directors: Fred Sears, William Castle, Mel Ferrer and Robert Gordon.

Director
His first film as director was Cry of the Werewolf (1944) with Nina Foch. He followed it with Sergeant Mike (1944) with Larry Parks, Dancing in Manhattan (1944), a documentary The Negro Sailor (1945) and I Love a Mystery (1945), based on the radio show.

Levin directed a swashbuckler The Fighting Guardsman (1945) and was called in to do some work on The Bandit of Sherwood Forest (1946), a Robin Hood movie that was hugely popular.

He directed Night Editor (1946), another based on a radio show, and two sequels to I Love a Mystery, The Devil's Mask (1946) and The Unknown (1946). Levin did another swashbuckler, The Return of Monte Cristo (1946).

Charles Vidor
Levin's next credit was the drama The Guilt of Janet Ames (1947), replacing Charles Vidor during filming.

By now he was one of Columbia's leading directors, making The Corpse Came C.O.D. (1948), The Gallant Blade (1948) with Larry Parks, The Mating of Millie (1948) with Glenn Ford, and The Man from Colorado (1949) with Ford and William Holden; on Colorado he replaced Vidor again during filming.

Levin helped direct Mr. Soft Touch (1949) with Ford, and had the biggest hit of his career with Jolson Sings Again (1949) starring Parks. He made a romantic comedy And Baby Makes Three (1949) then replaced Vidor another time on a musical with Joan Caulfield, The Petty Girl (1950).

Levin was reunited with Ford for Convicted (1950), and The Flying Missile (1950). He did some film noirs, Two of a Kind (1951) and The Family Secret (1951).

20th Century Fox
In April 1951 Levin signed an exclusive contract with 20th Century Fox. His first film for them was meant to be Mabel and Me Instead he did Belles on Their Toes (1952); The President's Lady (1952) a biopic of Andrew Jackson with Charlton Heston; The Farmer Takes a Wife (1953) with Betty Grable; Mister Scoutmaster (1953) with Clifton Webb; Three Young Texans (1954), a Western with Jeffrey Hunter; and The Gambler from Natchez (1954) a Western with Dale Robertson.

He did some uncredited work on Way of a Gaucho (1952).

Levin went to England to make The Dark Avenger (1954) with Errol Flynn, a co production between Fox and Allied Artists.

In 1956 he was announced for Love Story with Barbara Stanwyck and producer Paul Goldstein but the film was not made. For Allied he made Let's Be Happy (1957).

Pat Boone
Back at Fox Levin directed Pat Boone's first film, Bernardine (1957).

At Paramount he did a Western with Jack Palance, The Lonely Man (1957), then Fox called him back to do Boone's second film, April Love (1957).

He went to England to do a film for Fox, A Nice Little Bank That Should Be Robbed (1958), then back in Hollywood did two with Clifton Webb, The Remarkable Mr. Pennypacker (1959) and Holiday for Lovers (1959).

Webb was also meant to be in Levin's Journey to the Center of the Earth (1959) but fell ill and was replaced by James Mason; Pat Boone co-starred and the film was a huge hit.

MGM
Levin went to MGM where he did Where the Boys Are (1960), an ensemble romantic comedy for producer Joe Pasternak. It was a hit and MGM signed him to a four-year contract to make one film a year.

For the same studio he did The Wonders of Aladdin (1961) and The Wonderful World of the Brothers Grimm (1962), the latter an expensive costume picture which he did for George Pal in Cinerama; Pal did the fairy tale sequences and Levin did the Grimm brother scenes.

At Universal, Levin made If a Man Answers (1962) with Sandra Dee and Bobby Darin.

Back at MGM he did the last two pictures on his contract, Come Fly with Me (1963), a Where the Boys Are style comedy about air stewardesses, and Honeymoon Hotel (1964). While making the latter he said he was living in Rome.

Irving Allen
Levin returned to Columbia for Genghis Khan (1965), produced by Irving Allen. Columbia also released Kiss the Girls and Make Them Die (1965) which Levin directed for Dino de Laurentis.

Levin was going to do a film about the Danish resistance for Allen, The Savage Canary from a script by John Paxton but it was not made.

Instead Levin did two Matt Helm films with Dean Martin for Allen, Murderers' Row (1966) and The Ambushers (1967). During the making of the latter, a newspaper profile was published which claimed Levin's marriage was in trouble.

He made a Western, The Desperados (1969).

Later years
Levin's later credits included That Man Bolt (1973), Run for the Roses (1977), and The Treasure Seekers (1979).

At the end of his career, he finally did some television work, directing some episodes of Knots Landing in 1979 and his last work, the television movie Scout's Honor where he died on the last day of production.

Despite having been a stage actor, his only screen acting credit was in an episode of the 1974 television series Planet of the Apes.

Filmography as director 

Scout's Honor (1980 TV movie)
The Treasure Seekers (1979)
Run for the Roses (1977)
That Man Bolt (1973)
The Desperados (1969)
The Ambushers (1967)
Kiss the Girls and Make Them Die (1966)
Murderers' Row (1966)
Se Tutte le Donne del Mondo (1966)
Genghis Khan (1965)
Honeymoon Hotel (1964)
Come Fly with Me (1963)
If a Man Answers (1962)
The Wonderful World of the Brothers Grimm (1962)
Le Meraviglie di Aladino (1961)
Where the Boys Are (1960)
Journey to the Center of the Earth (1959)
Holiday for Lovers (1959)
The Remarkable Mr. Pennypacker (1959)
A Nice Little Bank That Should Be Robbed (1958)
April Love (1957)
The Lonely Man (1957)
Bernardine (1957)
Let's Be Happy (1957)
The Dark Avenger (1955)
The Gambler from Natchez (1954)
Three Young Texans (1954)
Mister Scoutmaster (1953)
The Farmer Takes a Wife (1953)
The President's Lady (1953)
Belles on Their Toes (1952)
The Family Secret (1951)
Two of a Kind (1951)
The Flying Missile (1950)
Convicted (1950)
The Petty Girl (1950)
And Baby Makes Three (1949)
Jolson Sings Again (1949)
Mr. Soft Touch (1949)
The Man from Colorado (1948)
The Gallant Blade (1948)
The Mating of Millie (1948)
The Corpse Came C.O.D. (1947)
The Guilt of Janet Ames (1947)
The Return of Monte Cristo (1946)
The Unknown (1946)
The Devil's Mask (1946)
Night Editor (1946)
The Bandit of Sherwood Forest (1946)
The Fighting Guardsman (1946)
Dancing in Manhattan (1945)
I Love a Mystery (1945)
The Negro Sailor (1945)
Sergeant Mike (1944)
Cry of the Werewolf (1944)

References

External links

Henry Levin at TCMDB

1909 births
1980 deaths
American film directors
American male stage actors
American television directors
American theatre directors
Film directors from New Jersey
Male actors from New Jersey